Jakob Christopher Bauers (born October 6, 1995) is an American professional baseball first baseman, outfielder, and designated hitter in the New York Yankees organization. He has played in Major League Baseball (MLB) for the Tampa Bay Rays, Cleveland Indians and Seattle Mariners. He bats and throws left-handed.

Amateur career
Bauers played amateur baseball with Ocean View Little League and with a travel baseball team based in Huntington Beach, California. He attended Marina High School in Huntington Beach, where he played for the school's baseball team and as a senior in 2013 led the Vikings to the CIF Southern Section Division 1 finals at Dodger Stadium. He committed to attend the University of Hawaii on a college baseball scholarship.

Professional career

San Diego Padres 
The San Diego Padres selected Bauers in the seventh round, with the 208th overall selection, of the 2013 MLB draft. After signing, Bauers spent his first professional season with the Arizona Padres of the Rookie-level Arizona League, posting a .282 batting average in 47 games. In 2014, Bauers played for the Fort Wayne TinCaps of the Class A Midwest League where he batted .296 with eight home runs and 64 RBIs in 112 games. He was named a postseason All-Star.

Tampa Bay Rays 

On December 19, 2014, the Padres traded Bauers, Burch Smith, and René Rivera to the Tampa Bay Rays in a three-team trade that saw the Rays trade Wil Myers, Jose Castillo and Ryan Hanigan to the Padres, the Padres trade Joe Ross and a player to be named later (Trea Turner) to the Washington Nationals, and Washington traded Steven Souza and Travis Ott to Tampa Bay. He began the 2015 season with the Charlotte Stone Crabs of the Class A-Advanced Florida State League, and was promoted to the Montgomery Biscuits of the Class AA Southern League in June. He finished the 2015 season with a combined .272 batting average with 11 home runs and 74 RBIs in 128 games between both teams. He stayed with the Biscuits for the 2016 season and batted .274 with 14 home runs and 78 RBIs in 135 games. Bauers spent the 2017 season with the Durham Bulls of the Class AAA International League where he batted .263 with 13 home runs, 63 RBIs and a career high twenty stolen bases in 132 games. The Rays added him to their 40-man roster after the season. Bauers returned to Durham at the beginning of the 2018 season.

2018 season 
The Rays promoted Bauers to the major leagues on June 7, 2018 and he made his major league debut the same night. In 52 games for Durham prior to his promotion, he was batting .279 with five home runs and 24 RBIs. He got his first major league hit, a double, on June 9 off of Seattle Mariners pitcher Félix Hernández. On June 24, 2018, Bauers hit his first career walk-off, a home run, against Chasen Shreve of the New York Yankees to finish a three-game sweep. Bauers homered in three straight games from July 29 to August 1. On August 23, Bauers scored the walk-off run, beating out a throw to home plate from Royals first baseman Ryan O'Hearn to secure a four-game sweep. In 96 games, he hit .201 with 11 home runs and 46 RBIs.

Cleveland Indians

On December 13, 2018, the Rays traded Bauers to the Cleveland Indians in a three-team trade in which the Rays acquired Yandy Díaz and Cole Sulser, and the Seattle Mariners acquired Edwin Encarnación from the Indians for Carlos Santana. On June 14, 2019, Bauers hit for the cycle against the Detroit Tigers. He was sent down to AAA on August 1, 2019. He was hitting .233 with 11 home runs in 100 games. Bauers did not make an appearance for the Indians in 2020.

In 2021, Bauers struggled to a .190/.277/.280 batting line with two home runs and six RBIs in 43 games before being designated for assignment on June 5, 2021.

Seattle Mariners
On June 10, 2021, the Indians traded Bauers to the Seattle Mariners in exchange for a player to be named later or cash (pitching prospect Damon Casetta-Stubbs was sent to the Indians on July 9 as the PTBNL). He made his Mariners debut that day, and notched a hit in his first at-bat with the team, a single off of Detroit Tigers starter Tyler Alexander. On September 19, against the Kansas City Royals, Bauers hit a home run with a projected distance of 460 ft – the longest homer by a Mariner since Mike Zunino in 2018, with only Zunino and Nelson Cruz having gone longer as Mariners since the 2015 season. Bauers played in 72 games for the Mariners, hitting .220 with 2 home runs and 13 RBIs. He became a free agent following the season.

Cincinnati Reds
On December 20, 2021, Bauers signed a minor league contract with the Cincinnati Reds. Bauers began 2022 with the Triple-A Louisville Bats, hitting .135/.276/.271 with 3 home runs and 12 RBI in 29 games.

New York Yankees
On June 3, 2022, Bauers was traded to the New York Yankees in exchange for cash considerations. He spent the remainder of the year with the Triple-A Scranton/Wilkes-Barre RailRiders, slashing .226/.352/.406 with 5 home runs and 16 RBI in 32 appearances. On December 13, 2022, Bauers re-signed with the Yankees.

References

External links

1995 births
Living people
Sportspeople from Huntington Beach, California
Baseball players from California
Major League Baseball first basemen
Tampa Bay Rays players
Cleveland Indians players
Seattle Mariners players
Arizona League Padres players
Fort Wayne TinCaps players
Charlotte Stone Crabs players
Montgomery Biscuits players
Mesa Solar Sox players
Durham Bulls players
Columbus Clippers players
Scranton/Wilkes-Barre RailRiders players
Louisville Bats players